Pseudorhizostomites howchini is a enigmatic member of the Ediacaran Biota which was originally been thought to have been a jellyfish of some kind (Sepkoski, 2002). P. howchini is now though to either have been a pseudofossil, a gas escape structure or perhaps the result of a rangeomorph holdfast being pulled by currents or, if any of these possibilities are not true, some other force from the sediments which enclosed the fossil.

Distribution and discovery 
Reginald Sprigg found the Holotype of P. howchini within the Flinders Ranges of South Australia. Fossils of Pseudorhizostomites also occur within the White Sea region of Russia on Zimnii Bereg, the Dniester River Basin of Podolia, Ukraine and Gornaya Baskkiria of the Ryauzyak Basin. These fossils are commonly found at all locations.

Classification and interpretations 

Originally, Sepkoski (2002) suggested the possibility of the problematic fossils as being a Jellyfish. Although a more modern and updated interpretation of P. howchini is it being a pseudo-fossil or a structure caused by the Holdfast of a Petalonamid being pulled out by the currents. Pseudorhizostomites tends to occur around very thin impressions and casts of fossils which are the likely producer of Pseudorhizostomites 
if they decayed. The decayed parts of the organisms preserved alongside the biogenic structure were also interpreted as escaping through an overlying sand lamina. The species Rugoconites tenuirugosus was thought to be the originator behind P. howchini ; the fossil was also compared with the living Hydrozoan Campanularia.

Description 

Pseudorhizostomites howchini is a form which represents a large amount of grooves radiating from a centre, which along the way irregularly branch out from one-another towards the outside. No distinct peripheral boundary is present in fossils. The central part which has the grooves radiating from is often strongly depressed (Negative hyporelief). The diameter of the grooves can often vary significantly, and can be from 9–60 mm in some specimens.

See also 

 Aspidella
 List of Ediacaran genera

References 

Ediacaran
Ediacaran life
Aquatic animals
Enigmatic prehistoric animal genera
Fossil taxa described in 1949